Andersson's Kalle (Swedish: Anderssonskans Kalle) is a 1922 Swedish silent comedy film directed by Sigurd Wallén and starring Gösta Alexandersson, Dagmar Ebbesen and Stina Berg. It is based on the 1901 novel of the same title by Emil Norlander, which has been adapted into films on several occasions. It was followed by a sequel New Pranks of Andersson's Kalle in 1923. In 1934 Wallén remade it into a sound film.

Cast
 Gösta Alexandersson as 	Kalle
 Anna Diedrich as 	Anderssonskan
 Dagmar Ebbesen as 	Pilgrenskan
 Stina Berg as 	Bobergskan
 Eugen Nilsson as 	Pilgren
 Aino Schärlund-Gille as 	Ann-Mari Graham
 Edith Wallén as 	Mjölk-Fia
 Hanna Rudahl as 	Petterssonskan
 Julia Cæsar as Lövbergskan
 Carl-Gunnar Wingård as 	Mogren
 Mathilda Caspér as Magasinsfrun
 Maja Cassel as 	Fru Graham
 Albin Lindahl as Graham
 Gertie Löweström as 	Pilgrenskans dotter

References

Bibliography
 Qvist, Per Olov & von Bagh, Peter. Guide to the Cinema of Sweden and Finland. Greenwood Publishing Group, 2000.

External links

1922 films
1922 comedy films
Swedish comedy films
Swedish silent feature films
Swedish black-and-white films
Films directed by Sigurd Wallén
1920s Swedish-language films
Films based on Swedish novels
Films set in Stockholm
Silent comedy films
1920s Swedish films